San Nicolás de Los Ranchos is a town and municipality in Puebla in southeastern Mexico.

References

Municipalities of Puebla